Kishen Kamania (born 11 June 1994) is a Tanzanian cricketer. He played in the 2014 ICC World Cricket League Division Five tournament.

References

External links
 

1994 births
Living people
Tanzanian cricketers
Place of birth missing (living people)
Wicket-keepers